Laikhurembi is a goddess in Meitei mythology and religion of Ancient Kangleipak (Antique Manipur). She is the goddess of justice, good counsel, divine law, order and secrecy. She is the chief Queen of God Thongaren.
She is the daughter of Lairen Humchouba. She is one of the divine incarnations of Leimarel Sidabi. She is one of the most important Umang Lais. Her pantheon is maintained particularly by the Taibungjam clan of Meitei ethnicity.

Etymology 
In Meitei language (Manipuri language), the female first name "Laikhurembi" can be split up into three parts, "Lai", "Khu" and "-rembi". The Meitei language word "Lai" has multiple meanings. It may mean a god or a deity or a spirit or a disease or a picture or a painting in noun form. "Lai" may mean easy in adjective form in Meitei language. The Meitei language term "Khu" also has many meanings. It may mean "narrow" or "not wide" in adjective form. It may mean a knee in noun form. It may mean "to kneel" or "to cough" in verbal form. According to "The History Of Manipur" written by Wahengbam Ibohal, the word Laikhurembi is Lai+Khu+rembi which is a combination of "Lai" and "Khu" surnames i.e. descendants from these two different groups of people. The last part "-rembi" means chief, head or graceful in feminine form.

History and Origin 
According to the Poireiton Khunthok, Laikhurembi was the chief queen of Thongaren. This book talks about her body in ways that show her personality. They say she had a wide mouth, which means she was loud or boastful. They say she had small breasts, which meant she used her heart less than she used her head; she was a thinking person and not a feeling person. They say she had sideways eyes, meaning she did not look at people straight on.

Scholars think this queen may have had Asian ethnicity. Some scholars think Laikhurembi could come from a tribe that had both Lai and Khu people in it. Other scholars think "Laikhurembi" is just her title and not her name.

Laikhurembi is the daughter of Lai-ren Humchouba (Shan: Hoom Chao Hpa). In Meitei language (Manipuri language), "Lai-ren" means "Chief of Lai". In Meitei language, the word "Lai" has many meanings.

Queen Laikhurembi was the first wife of King Thongaren. Then king asked her to marry his younger brother, Poireiton, instead, because Poireiton's wife had died. Poireiton was beginning a journey to Tai Pang Pan (old name of Manipur) and King Thongalel thought it would not be good for Poireiton to go without a wife. However, Laikhurembi did not want to go. Trees had already been planted to honor her as the King's wife. Instead of Laikhurembi, King Thongalel sent his second wife Leinaotabi to accompany her brother in law Poireiton as a wife.

Description 
The Goddess Laikhurembi had special powers. She was Yungyatnaba (lit. erect and sharp) which meant she could see objects accurately no matter how far away they were. She could look at a person and see who he or she truly was inside. When she made a judgement, she would announce her decision wisely, and people got the right rewards for what they had done (things given in recognition of service, effort or achievement).

No one could find the Goddess Laikhurembi unless she wanted them to find her. No matter how hard a person would look, she could hide and stay hidden.

Cult 
There is a temple dedicated to Goddess Laikhurembi in Uripok town in Imphal West district of Manipur. During the Lai Haraoba festival of Uripok, a carnival like atmosphere subdues the sacred traditional ritualistic ceremonies. During the noisy possession of the festive occasions, the maibis dance in the gentle melodies of pena. The maibis became possessed by the spirits when the music stopped and they delivered oracles. During this, the audiences listen to them very attentively.

See also 
 Lainaotabi
 Yumjao Leima

References

External links 

 Learners' Manipuri-English dictionary. Laikhurembi

Abundance deities
Abundance goddesses
Arts deities
Arts goddesses
Asian deities
Asian goddesses
Beauty deities
Beauty goddesses
Fortune deities
Fortune goddesses
Justice deities
Justice goddesses
Knowledge deities
Knowledge goddesses
Leima
Magic deities
Magic goddesses
Maintenance deities
Maintenance goddesses
Marriage deities
Marriage goddesses
Meitei deities
Names of God in Sanamahism
Nature deities
Nature goddesses
Peace deities
Peace goddesses
Time and fate deities
Time and fate goddesses
Underworld deities
Underworld goddesses
Wisdom deities
Wisdom goddesses